Giulia Bourguignon Marinho (born 13 August 1999), known professionally as Giulia Be, is a Brazilian singer, songwriter and actress. She gained recognition in 2018 when she signed with Warner Music Brasil and released the track "With You" with Brazilian DJ Zerb. At the beginning of 2019, she got her first hit "Too Bad", the song was the soundtrack of the 9:00 am soap opera "O Sétimo Guardião" by Rede Globo, the main soap opera in the country at the time. In the same year, she got her second hit "Menina Solta", number #1 in Portugal, top 10 in the Brazilian chart, and top 1 on the Spotify chart in Portugal and top 50 in Mexico. In 2022, she starred in the Netflix film Depois do Universo.

Biography and Career

Born and raised in Rio de Janeiro, Giulia started playing piano at the age of six and composing at eight, and currently composes songs in Portuguese, English and Spanish. Daughter of Adriana Marinho - who is also her manager - and businessman Paulo Marinho, sister of presenter and comedian André Marinho, composer and producer Dany Marinho and lawyer Maria Proença Marinho.

During Rock in Rio 2017, she went with a friend to Maroon 5's dressing room to take a picture and ended up singing "She Will Be Loved" with the group members. After receiving praise from the band's guitarist Mickey Madden for her voice, it spurred the artist on and she decided to drop out of law school to pursue a music career.

In 2018, she signed with Warner Music and signed her first official work, a collaboration on Zerb's single "With You". In February 2019, Giulia released her debut single "Too Bad" in English. Shortly after its release, the song entered the soundtrack of the nine soap opera O Sétimo Guardião, by Rede Globo, and also entered the top 50 viral of Spotify globally. In April of the same year, Giulia released "Chega", her second single and the first performed in Portuguese.

In August 2019, she released her third single "Menina Solta", which sounds calmer than her previous singles. In December 2019 the song "Menina Solta" was Top 10 by Spotify Brazil. The singer released a Spanish version of the song, "Chiquita Suelta", due to the song's success in some Latin countries. In June 2020, Giulia Be's album with the song "Menina Solta" was certified platinum in Brazil. It was included in the soundtrack of the soap opera Amor sem Igual, on RecordTV, as one of the protagonist's themes. Despite her short career, Giulia performed at Rock in Rio 2019 alongside Projota and Vitão.

In March 2020, Giulia released "No Era Amor", her fourth single, and on 15 May her first EP, "Solta". The songs "If This Life Were A Movie" and "Relapse", also singles from the EP, had great repercussion. Giulia released "Unforgettable", her first partnership, with Luan Santana on October 9, 2020, also releasing the Spanish version of the song, "Inolvidable", on the same day. On December 18, Giulia released "I Love Me More" as the fifth single from the EP "Solta", along with the deluxe extended play version. In June 2021, she released the single "Lokko", chosen as the lead single for her new album. In June 2021, Giulia Be teamed up with David Carreira, Ludmilla and Preto Show, together they released the song "Vamos Com Tudo", official theme song for Portugal's selection for Euro 2020.

At the end of 2020, Spotify announced that "Menina Solta" by Giulia was the most listened to Portuguese song in Portugal through Spotify, while the most listened to international song was "Blinding Lights" by The Weeknd.

Filmography

Discography

Studio albums

Extended plays

Singles

As lead artist

Promotional Singles

As guest artist

Awards and nominations

References

1999 births
21st-century Brazilian singers
21st-century Brazilian women singers
Brazilian women singer-songwriters
Living people
Brazilian people of French descent
Brazilian people of Portuguese descent
Brazilian people of Spanish descent
Women in Latin music